Janice Felice Karman Bagdasarian is an American actress, producer, writer, and director. She is the co-owner of Bagdasarian Productions with her husband Ross Bagdasarian Jr.

Early life 

Karman was born in Los Angeles, California. Her father was psychologist Harvey Leroy Karman (born Harvey Walters). Her mother, Felice Karman, was also a psychologist. Karman played the role of Bunny in the 1975 film Switchblade Sisters (alternate title: The Jezebels), and Hank in the 1976 exploitation film Slumber Party '57.

Bagdasarian Productions 

The focus of Bagdasarian Productions company is on creating albums, cartoons, and other products based on the Alvin and the Chipmunks characters, who were created by Bagdasarian's father Ross Bagdasarian, besides helping to produce the records and cartoons. Karman provides the singing voices of Theodore and the members of the female spin-off group The Chipettes: Brittany, Jeanette, and Eleanor (Dody Goodman did the voice of Miss Beatrice Miller as well).

In 1983, Janice Karman as writer and producer, assisted with the creation of an Alvin and The Chipmunks version of the Christmas Carol. This version of the film is available on DVD.

In Little Alvin and the Mini-Munks, Janice also got to play the role of La-Lu. She originally voiced Theodore in the live-action/computer-animated film adaptation, but for promotional reasons Theodore was re-recorded by the singer and actor Jesse McCartney. However, her singing was kept in.

Personal life 
Karman and her husband Ross Bagdasarian Jr. were married in 1980, together they have two children, a daughter Vanessa and a son Michael.

References

External links

Living people
Actresses from Los Angeles
Alvin and the Chipmunks
American voice actresses
American women record producers
Lee Strasberg Theatre and Film Institute alumni
Record producers from California
20th-century American actresses
21st-century American actresses
Year of birth missing (living people)